In mathematics, a hyperoctahedral group is an important type of group that can be realized as the group of symmetries of a hypercube or of a cross-polytope. It was named by Alfred Young in 1930. Groups of this type are identified by a parameter , the dimension of the hypercube.

As a Coxeter group it is of type , and as a Weyl group it is associated to the symplectic groups and with the orthogonal groups in odd dimensions. As a wreath product it is  where  is the symmetric group of degree . As a permutation group, the group is the signed symmetric group of permutations π either of the set  or of the set  such that  for all . As a matrix group, it can be described as the group of  orthogonal matrices whose entries are all integers. Equivalently, this is the set of  matrices with entries only 0, 1, or –1, which are invertible, and which have exactly one non-zero entry in each row or column.

Geometric figures in three dimensions with this symmetry group are said to have octahedral symmetry, named after the regular octahedron, or 3-orthoplex. In 4-dimensions it is called a hexadecachoric symmetry, after the regular 16-cell, or 4-orthoplex. In two dimensions, the hyperoctahedral group structure is the abstract dihedral group of order eight, describing the symmetry of a square, or 2-orthoplex.

By dimension 

Hyperoctahedral groups can be named as Bn, a bracket notation, or as a Coxeter group graph:

Subgroups
There is a notable index two subgroup, corresponding to the Coxeter group Dn and the symmetries of the demihypercube. Viewed as a wreath product, there are two natural maps from the hyperoctahedral group to the cyclic group of order 2: one map coming from "multiply the signs of all the elements" (in the n copies of ), and one map coming from the parity of the permutation. Multiplying these together yields a third map . The kernel of the first map is the Coxeter group  In terms of signed permutations, thought of as matrices, this third map is simply the determinant, while the first two correspond to "multiplying the non-zero entries" and "parity of the underlying (unsigned) permutation", which are not generally meaningful for matrices, but are in the case due to the coincidence with a wreath product.

The kernels of these three maps are all three index two subgroups of the hyperoctahedral group, as discussed in H1: Abelianization below, and their intersection is the derived subgroup, of index 4 (quotient the Klein 4-group), which corresponds to the rotational symmetries of the demihypercube.

In the other direction, the center is the subgroup of scalar matrices, {±1}; geometrically, quotienting out by this corresponds to passing to the projective orthogonal group.

In dimension 2 these groups completely describe the hyperoctahedral group, which is the dihedral group Dih4 of order 8, and is an extension 2.V (of the 4-group by a cyclic group of order 2). In general, passing to the subquotient (derived subgroup, mod center) is the symmetry group of the projective demihypercube.

The hyperoctahedral subgroup, Dn by dimension:

The chiral hyper-octahedral symmetry, is the direct subgroup, index 2 of hyper-octahedral symmetry.

Another notable index 2 subgroup can be called hyper-pyritohedral symmetry, by dimension: These groups have n orthogonal mirrors in n-dimensions.

Homology
The group homology of the hyperoctahedral group is similar to that of the symmetric group, and exhibits stabilization, in the sense of stable homotopy theory.

H1: abelianization
The first homology group, which agrees with the abelianization, stabilizes at the Klein four-group, and is given by:

The maps are explicitly given as "the product of the signs of all the elements" (in the n copies of ), and the sign of the permutation. Multiplying these together yields a third non-trivial map (the determinant of the matrix, which sends both these classes to ), and together with the trivial map these form the 4-group.

H2: Schur multipliers

They are:

Notes

References 

 
 
 

 
 
 
 
 

Finite reflection groups